Chris Garrett (born February 11, 1987, in New York, New York) is a former running back who played for the Winnipeg Blue Bombers of the Canadian Football League from 2010 to 2013. Garrett grew up in Utica, New York before playing college football at Ohio University.

Career
In his first season with starting reps for the Bombers in 2011, Garrett cemented the starting role as a third stringer. He gained the spot after starters Fred Reid and backup Carl Volny went down with injury in the same game. Garrett then helped the team to the 99th Grey Cup with a 190-yard performance in the CFL East final against the Hamilton Tiger-Cats. He dedicated the game ball to former teammate Marcellis Williamson in an emotional tribute after the game, also promising to send the ball to Williamson's family. Garrett was then named the offensive player of the week by the CFL, for his playoff performance against the Tiger-Cats.

Garrett missed the entire 2012 CFL season after injuring his injured his Achilles in training camp. Upon recovery during the following season, he was released by the Bombers on August 14, 2013.

On September 4, 2013, the Saskatchewan Roughriders signed Garrett. He was released during the off season.

Statistics

References

1987 births
Living people
African-American players of Canadian football
American players of Canadian football
Canadian football running backs
Winnipeg Blue Bombers players
Ohio Bobcats football players
21st-century African-American sportspeople
20th-century African-American people